Medha Manjrekar (born 28 April 1967) is an Indian actress and producer in Marathi cinema, known for Natsamrat (2016), Kaksparsh (2012) and De Dhakka (2008). She played lead role opposite Nana Patekar in 2016 Marathi film Natsamrat, the highest-grossing film in Marathi cinema at the time. She is the wife of Mahesh Manjrekar.

Filmography

References

External links
 

Actresses in Marathi cinema
Actresses from Mumbai
Indian film actresses
Living people
1967 births
21st-century Indian actresses